Burgstädt is a town in the district of Mittelsachsen, in Saxony, Germany. It is situated 12 km northwest of Chemnitz.

Sons and daughters of the city 

 Erich Gleixner (1920-1962), footballer
 Peter Jahr (born 1959), politician (CDU)
 Barbara Köhler (born 1959), lyricist
 Rico Lieder (born 1971), athlete
 Gerhard Wahrig (1923-1978), lexicographer

References 

Mittelsachsen